The 174th Ohio Infantry Regiment, sometimes 174th Ohio Volunteer Infantry (or 174th OVI) was an infantry regiment in the Union Army during the American Civil War.

Service
The 174th Ohio Infantry was organized at Camp Chase in Columbus, Ohio August 16 through September 21, 1864, and mustered in for one year service on September 21, 1864, under the command of Colonel John Sills Jones.

The regiment was attached to Post of Murfreesboro, Tennessee, Department of the Cumberland, to October 1864. District of North Alabama, Department of the Cumberland, to December 1864. 3rd Brigade, 1st Division, XXIII Corps, Army of the Ohio, to February 1865, and Department of North Carolina to June 1865.

The 174th Ohio Infantry mustered out of service June 28, 1865, at Charlotte, North Carolina.

Detailed service
Left Ohio for Nashville, Tenn., September 23, arriving there September 26. Moved to Murfreesboro, Tenn., and duty in the defenses of that city until October 27. Moved from Murfreesboro to Decatur, Ala., October 27. Defense of Decatur October 27–29. Moved to Elk River October 29 (four companies detached at Athens, Alabama). Returned to Decatur November 1 and duty there until November 25. Moved to Murfreesboro November 25. Action at Overall's Creek December 4. Siege of Murfreesboro December 5–12. Wilkinson's Pike, near Murfreesboro, December 7. Ordered to Clifton, Tenn., and duty there until January 17, 1865. Movement to Washington, D.C., January 17–29, and duty there until February 21. Moved to Fort Fisher, N.C., February 21–23, to Morehead City February 24, and to New Berne February 25. Advance on Kingston and Goldsboro March 6–21. Battle of Wise's Forks March 8–10. Occupation of Kinston March 14, and of Goldsboro March 21. Advance on Raleigh April 10–14. Occupation of Raleigh April 14. Bennett's House April 26. Surrender of Johnston and his army. Duty at Raleigh and Charlotte, N.C., until June.

Casualties
The regiment lost a total of 117 men during service; 1 officer and 21 enlisted men killed or mortally wounded, 1 officer and 94 enlisted men due to disease.

Commanders
 Colonel John Sills Jones

Notable members
 Colonel John Sills Jones - U.S. Representative from Ohio, 1877-1879

See also

 List of Ohio Civil War units
 Ohio in the Civil War

References
 Dyer, Frederick H. A Compendium of the War of the Rebellion (Des Moines, IA:  Dyer Pub. Co.), 1908.
 Jones, John Sills. 'History of the 174th O.V.I. and Roster of the Regiment (Marysville, OH:  Journal Print), 1894.
 Ohio Roster Commission. Official Roster of the Soldiers of the State of Ohio in the War on the Rebellion, 1861–1865, Compiled Under the Direction of the Roster Commission (Akron, OH: Werner Co.), 1886-1895.
 Reid, Whitelaw. Ohio in the War: Her Statesmen, Her Generals, and Soldiers (Cincinnati, OH: Moore, Wilstach, & Baldwin), 1868. 
Attribution

External links
 Ohio in the Civil War: 174th Ohio Volunteer Infantry by Larry Stevens
 National flag of the 174th Ohio Infantry
 Regimental flag of the 174th Ohio Infantry
 Another regimental flag of the 174th Ohio Infantry

Military units and formations established in 1864
Military units and formations disestablished in 1865
Units and formations of the Union Army from Ohio
1864 establishments in Ohio